Ellen Thomas (born 3 February 1956) is a Sierra Leonean-British actress, known for her roles as Liz Webbe in the Channel 4 sitcom Teachers and Claudette Hubbard in the BBC soap opera EastEnders.

Career
In Teachers, Thomas played Liz Webbe, a school secretary, and appeared in all four series, from 2001 to 2004. She was a regular cast member in BBC Radio 4's Clare in the Community and in BBC Three's Coming of Age, in which she portrayed the principal. For her role in Rev, she was nominated for "Best TV Comedy Performance" at the Black International Film Festival and Music Video & Screen Awards.

She is also known for her minor role in Come Fly with Me, as Mrs Mbutu.

Thomas is known for the number of characters she has portrayed in the BBC soap opera EastEnders. She played Pearl Chadwick in 1990, Estella Hulton in 2002, Grace Olubunmi from 2010 to 2011, and Claudette Hubbard from 2015 to 2016. From 2018 to 2019, Thomas appeared in the medical drama by the BBC, Casualty, in the recurring role of Omo Masters.

Filmography

Awards and nominations

References

External links

1956 births
20th-century British actresses
21st-century British actresses
English television actresses
English film actresses
British stage actresses
Black British actresses
English people of Sierra Leonean descent
English soap opera actresses
Living people
20th-century English women
20th-century English people
21st-century English women
21st-century English people